Mordellistena hungarica is a species of beetle in the family Mordellidae which is in the superfamily Tenebrionoidea. It was described in 1977 by Ermisch and can be found in Croatia and Hungary.

References

hungarica
Beetles described in 1977
Beetles of Europe